If a motion of no confidence in the Taoiseach or Government of Ireland is passed by Dáil Éireann, or a motion of confidence is defeated, then the Constitution requires both the Taoiseach and the Government to resign. After this, either a replacement Taoiseach is elected by the Dáil, or the Dáil is dissolved and a general election is held. Motions have twice brought down the government, in each case resulting in an election: in November 1982 and again in November 1992.

Confidence and supply

In the Westminster model of parliamentary democracy, the minimum support necessary for a cabinet government to continue in office is confidence and supply from the legislative chamber or house to which the government is responsible. In Ireland's bicameral Oireachtas, the government is responsible to the Dáil (lower house). As well as the November 1982 and November 1992 instances of loss of confidence, there has been one occasion when the Irish government fell due to loss of supply in the Dáil. That was in January 1982, when Jim Kemmy withdrew support for the minority Fine Gael–Labour government by opposing a budget resolution (apocryphally because it would introduce VAT on children's shoes). In 1949, the Inter-Party government immediately sought leave to reintroduce a budget estimate "referred back for reconsideration" by 62–59 vote of the Dáil; the estimate duly passed 73–59 the next week. The Fianna Fáil opposition argued unsuccessfully that the first vote should have been taken as loss of confidence and supply, triggering the government's resignation.

Loss of supply is when the opposition defeats a government spending proposal; the converse, when the government fails to defeat an opposition spending proposal, is merely symbolic, as both the 1922 and 1937 constitutions prohibit Oireachtas spending without government approval. On 27 March 1930, due to the temporary absence of several Cumann na nGaedheal TDs, a Fianna Fáil opposition private member's money bill passed second reading; W. T. Cosgrave observed the formality of resigning as President of the Executive Council. He and the Executive Council were immediately re-elected by the Dáil.

There have been occasions when Seanad Éireann (the upper house) voted on a confidence motion; even if the government had lost the motion, it would not have fallen. Similarly, Dáil motions of no confidence in a minister other than the Taoiseach would not formally necessitate a dissolution, although they may be treated politically as confidence in the whole government, on the basis of cabinet collective responsibility. The Social Democrats suggested their (unsuccessful) 2019 motion against Eoghan Murphy did not entail an election. In October 1976, Fianna Fáil proposed a motion calling on the Taoiseach to request the Minister for Defence, Paddy Donegan, to resign, which was similar in effect if not in form to a confidence motion. It was defeated by 63 votes to 58, and took place a week before a motion of confidence in the government in the circumstances of the same controversy.

In the revolutionary Dáil of the self-proclaimed Irish Republic, the Dáil vote on 7 January 1922 to approve the Anglo-Irish Treaty was a defeat in the position advocated by Éamon de Valera, who took it as loss of confidence and resigned as President of Dáil Éireann. De Valera was proposed again for the position of president, but was defeated; the Dáil was not dissolved and the pro-Treaty majority voted Arthur Griffith as the new President.

In December 1982, Fianna Fáil turned an adjournment debate into an ersatz motion of confidence in the Fine Gael–Labour coalition. First Séamus Brennan tabled an amendment to the adjournment motion, "and requests the Taoiseach in the meantime to advise the President to dissolve the Dáil"; then in the ensuing debate other Fianna Fáil TDs mentioned the budget, so that losing the debate would imply loss of supply. The amendment was defeated 82–81.

Ensuing dissolutions
Whereas in some jurisdictions the convention is for a prime minister who has lost confidence or supply to call an election, in Ireland he may be unable to do so, because the post-1937 Constitution gives the President absolute discretion to refuse to dissolve the Dáil when requested by a Taoiseach who has lost confidence.  no President has made such a refusal. The intention is to allow the Dáil to choose an alternative Taoiseach and government from among the existing Oireachtas members without the trouble of an election. During the 1937 debate on the draft Constitution, Patrick McGilligan suggested making it compulsory rather than discretionary for the President to refuse a dissolution to a Taoiseach who had lost confidence; Éamon de Valera, the Constitution's prime instigator, rejected this, explaining his rationale:

On two occasions the president's power to refuse a dissolution was politically significant. In January 1982, President Patrick Hillery acceded to Taoiseach Garret FitzGerald's request for a dissolution, resulting in a general election. Brian Lenihan Snr unsuccessfully tried to persuade the President to refuse a dissolution and allow Fianna Fáil to try to form a new government; an action which caused controversy when he ran in the 1990 presidential election. In 1994, when Labour left the coalition it had formed with Fianna Fáil in 1992, there was neither a confidence motion nor a request for a dissolution. Instead, negotiations led to a new coalition of Fine Gael, Labour, and Democratic Left. Fianna Fáil Taoiseach Albert Reynolds did not attempt to forestall this by requesting a dissolution, because he believed President Mary Robinson would have refused.

Whereas losing a formal confidence motion is legal proof that "a Taoiseach … has ceased to retain the support of a majority in Dáil Éireann", jurists express uncertainty over how other scenarios might fulfil this Constitutional proviso. Robinson sought legal advice after the 1994 Labour walkout, but since Reynolds did not seek a dissolution, her power to refuse him was not tested. On several occasions a Taoiseach leading a minority government has obtained a dissolution where diminished support meant they would be vulnerable to losing a motion of confidence: in September 1927, 1938, 1944, 1951, 1957, 1987, and 2020. The 1922 Constitution of the Irish Free State required an Executive Council which had lost the Dáil's confidence to have its approval for a dissolution; W. T. Cosgrave circumvented this in September 1927 by calling an election while the Dáil was adjourned.

Procedure for motions
The standing orders of the Dáil have no special provisions for confidence motions, which are treated like any other motion. However, the prohibition on repeating motions previously moved in a session does not apply to confidence motions. Most motions of no confidence in Ireland have been tabled by an opposition party when the government's majority is secure but it is dealing with scandals, embarrassments, or poor election results. The opposition has no prospect of winning the vote, but can inflict symbolic damage in the debate. The practice in such cases is for the government to replace the opposition motion of no confidence with its own motion of confidence; either by an amendment to the original motion replacing its entire wording, or by using its control of the legislative agenda to pre-empt the usual order of business with a new motion. The time allocated for government speakers is higher on its own motion than it would have been on an opposition motion.

List of motions

Footnotes

Sources
 
 
 Constitution of Ireland
 Dáil debates 1919–present

References
Dáil debates

Dáil votes

Other

Dail Eireann
Dáil Éireann
Government of the Republic of Ireland